Chhajje Chhajje Ka Pyaar is an Indian television series that aired on Sony TV February 28–26 July 2011. The story is about a romantic love experience on the terrace of old Delhi between the daughter of a homeowner and the son of tenant. The series portrays culture, lifestyle and tradition of old Delhi.

Plot 

Based in Delhi, this story deals with two families, the Sehgals and the Tripathiis, living under the same roof as owners and tenants. There are colorful characters sharing emotions and bonds of friendship, animosity, love, hate, conspiracy, trust and respect.
 
The story starts with Ginny and Dhruv, who are best friends and share a love-hate relationship. Through them we establish the rest of the family members. Dhruv's youngest sister Megha gets married. At the sangeet ceremony Dimpy (Ginny's elder sister) and Daksh (Dhruv's elder brother) perform on a song. This gives an idea to the fathers and they convince their wives to get the two married. However, on the wedding day, Daksh ditches the wedding and marries his manipulative boss, who plays the villain's role.

All the while, Ginny and Dhruv fall in love with each other but can't tell their family members because they are waiting for the right time. In a twist, their families decide to get Dhruv and Dimpy married, thinking Dhruv will keep her happy, which brings Dhruv's and Ginny's love to a complete halt. Ginny decides to sacrifice her love for the sake of her older sister. Dhruv is not happy about this but he silently agrees to marry Dimpy despite still being in love with Ginny. Thus, the wedding preparations begin. They marry, but Lipika will ruin everything.

After a while, Dimpy gets to know about Dhruv and Ginny's sacrifice. She decides to divorce Dhruv so he can stay happily with Ginny. But Dhruv refuses to divorce her and tells Dimpy that he wants to give their relationship one more chance. He explains her that no one will be happy after their divorce: neither him nor Ginny, not even Dimpy nor the family members.

In the last episode, Dimpy keeps fast for Dhruv's well-being. Ginny feels happy to see everybody happy. A new neighbour comes from his chajja to their chajja and introduces himself as Rohan. He starts flirting with Ginny and Pammi Aunty tells Ginny that the lad is very good.

Cast
Shambhavi Sharma as Ginny Sehgal
Manish Tulsiyani as Dhruv Tripathi 
Neha Janpandit / Anjali Abrol as Dimpy Sehgal / Dimpy Dhruv Tripathi
Snigdha Pandey as Pinky
Aniruddh Singh as Daksh Tripathi
Mazher Sayed as Dhairya Tripathi 
Virendra Saxena as Dinanath Tripathi
Kiran Kumar as Avtar Sehgal
Priya Ahuja as Megha Tripathi

References

External links
Chhajje Chhajje Ka Pyaar Official Site on Sony TV
Official Site on SET Asia

Sony Entertainment Television original programming
Indian television soap operas
Indian drama television series
2011 Indian television series endings
2011 Indian television series debuts
Television shows set in Delhi